Kenneth Norman Jones   (17 April 1924 – 19 January 2022) was an Australian senior public servant.

Early life
Kenneth Jones was born in Bundaberg, Queensland, on 17 April 1924. He attended the University of Queensland, graduating with a Bachelor of Commerce.

Career
Jones began his Commonwealth Public Service career in 1941 when he joined the Official Receiver's Office in Queensland.

He was appointed to his first Secretary role in January 1973, at the Department of Education. He stayed head of that department for over ten years, and subsequently served as head of Department of Education and Youth Affairs (March 1983), Department of Administrative Services (March 1983 to December 1984) and the Department of Local Government and Administrative Services (December 1984 to July 1987). In total, he was a Secretary in the Australian Government for over 13 years, retiring in 1986.

Personal life and death
Jones died in Canberra on 19 January 2022, at the age of 97.

Awards
In the New Year's Honours List for 1969 Jones was created a Commander of the Order of the British Empire. In June 1986 he was made an Officer of the Order of Australia, for public service, particularly in the fields of education and departmental administration.

Notes

References and further reading

1924 births
2022 deaths
Australian Commanders of the Order of the British Empire
Australian public servants
Officers of the Order of Australia
Secretaries of the Australian Government Education Department
University of Queensland alumni
People from Bundaberg